"Hey Little Girl" is a single released by Australian band Icehouse, the second single from the band's 1982 album, Primitive Man. The album and single were co-produced by band member and the track's writer, Iva Davies, and Keith Forsey. It was released in November 1982 on Regular Records in 7" vinyl single and 12" vinyl single formats. UK and Europe releases by Chrysalis Records were also on 7" and 12" formats, but with different track listings. The single was then released in the US in 1983 on the same formats. On "Hey Little Girl", Iva Davies uses the Linn drum machine—the first for an Australian recording. It peaked at No. 7 on the Australian singles chart and No. 2 in Switzerland, No. 5 in Germany, Top 20 in UK, Sweden and Netherlands, and No. 31 on the Billboard Mainstream Rock chart.

The US cover for the single has a still from the Russell Mulcahy music video for "Hey Little Girl".

In 1997, a series of re-mixes of the song was released in Germany on the Edel Music label. Another remix version by Infusion was released on the Icehouse album Meltdown in 2002.

Charts

Weekly charts

Year-end charts

Track listing
All tracks written by Iva Davies.

7" single (Australian/NZ release)
"Hey Little Girl" – 3:53
"Glam" (dance remix) – 6:40

7" single (UK/Europe release)
"Hey Little Girl" – 4:10
"Love in Motion" – 3:34

12" single (Australian/NZ release)
"Hey Little Girl" (extended dance remix) — 6:59
"Glam" — 3:18
"Glam" (extended dance remix) — 6:38

12" single (UK/Europe release)
"Hey Little Girl" (disco edit mix) – 7:00
"Hey Little Girl" – 3:40
"Can't Help Myself" (club disco mix) – 5:58

7" single (US release)
"Hey Little Girl" – 3:40
"Mysterious Thing" – 4:21

12" single (US release)
"Hey Little Girl" (extended version) – 6:11
"Hey Little Girl (dub version) – 6:14

CD single (German release)
"Hey Little Girl" (radio edit) – 3:45
"Hey Little Girl" (future house single) – 3:40
"Hey Little Girl" (x/tended edit) – 4:59
"Hey Little Girl" (DJ Darling vs DJ Sören) – 6:40
"Hey Little Girl" (original version) – 4:22

12" version (German release)
"Hey Little Girl" (DJ Darling vs DJ Sören) – 6:40
"Hey Little Girl" (future house single) – 3:40
"Hey Little Girl" (X/tended edit) – 4:59
"Hey Little Girl" (radio edit) – 3:45

Personnel
Credits:
Icehouse members
Iva Davies – vocals, guitar, Sequential Circuits Prophet-5, bass guitar, Linn drum machine

Additional musicians
Keith Forsey – additional percussion
Guy Pratt – bass guitar and backing vocals

Recording details
Produced – Iva Davies, Keith Forsey

Accolades
"Hey Little Girl" is included in Robert Dimery's 1001 Songs You Must Hear Before You Die.

References

1982 songs
1982 singles
1997 singles
Icehouse (band) songs
Songs written by Iva Davies
Song recordings produced by Keith Forsey
Music videos directed by Russell Mulcahy
Regular Records singles
Chrysalis Records singles